Inusa Dawuda is an Afro-German musician, singer, record producer, and percussionist.

Early life 
Inusa Dawuda was born in Accra, Ghana, and as a teenager he moved with his parents to Hamburg, Germany. Inusa learned to play the saxophone during his youth, and he was also actively involved in sports. During the early 1990s he was a multiple boxing champion in Hamburg in the light heavyweight division.

The first successes in the field of music came to Inusa in the mid 1990s, when he traveled and played with several bands, playing cover versions of favorite hits from James Brown to Bob Marley. His primary musical influences include Manu Dibango, Fela Kuti, and Grover Washington, Jr.

Career highlights 
Inusa eventually embarked on a solo career embracing House music as his preferred performance genre. In 2006, he recorded the club single, Morning Light, with its Chillout version selling a million copies in the world-famous Café del Mar collection (volume 9).

From 2006 to 2010 Inusa recorded his most popular tracks Rumours (Digi Digi), Rub-A-Dub Girl, Down Down Down, and We Want More.

Inusa's track, "I Don't Know" (with Astero) was included on the album, VA Mega Dance Party: Hits of the Year, 2011 (Dance, Club category).

In 2012, the U.S.-based company, Hip Video Promotions, is officially promoting Inusa's summer hit, "Satisfaction" for nationwide exposure and rotation.

Career accomplishments 
Inusa is a collaborative artist, having enjoyed collaborations and support for his recordings from some of the biggest House giants like Erick Morillo, Paul Oakenfold, and radio rotations worldwide.

For 2009–10, Inusa was acknowledged as "Russia's Most Successful Foreign Artist", where to-date his single Rumours (Digi Digi) has received an excess of over a million radio plays, beating a stream of fellow foreign artists in a category that included Lady Gaga and David Guetta.

Inusa Dawuda's work is released on recording labels from BMG to Universal Music, Pacha Recordings, Tiger Records-Kontor Records, Hed Kandi and Kingdom of Music. He performs primarily in Germany, Russia, Turkey, Austria, Ukraine, Poland, Albania and other Scandinavian countries. Inusa's music is also renowned in other countries like Croatia, Italy, France and the UK, where his tracks often appear in playlists and club charts.

His 2011 releases I Don't Know, Now or Never and Walking on Sunshine continue to be popular tunes across the club and video scene. Dawuda's 2012 release, "Let's Do It" was a collaborative release from the UK label, Champion Records. His summer 2012 release, Satisfaction, was in collaboration with Khetama and EES.

Inusa Dawuda has also recorded in the lounge and chillout genres with some of his house tracks like Morning Light and You Are covered to cross-over as ballads. Lounge instrumentals like Reflections, Waterfalls, Nubian Memories, and African Nights, showcase Inusa's work as a vocalist, saxophonist, percussionist, and performer.

Inusa's single, "You Belong to the City (Niels Van Gogh Dub Mix)" (with Choc Choc Zoo), appears on the Best of Dance Music 2012 album.

For early 2013, Dawuda released "Hey Mr. DJ" which became a European hit, while his 2011 album "I Feel Beautiful" gained renewed recognition in the United States.

On 20 May 2013, Inusa's track, "Disco Flight", a collaboration with renowned House DJs Max Creative and DJ Beavis, reached the No. 2 slot on the Kings of Spins Top 20 club tracks list.

Appearances 
Inusa was a guest performer at the Gala Show of the Queen of Ukraine Pageant in 2010.

In 2011, Inusa appeared in Nigar Jamal's debut video, "Crush on You."

Personal life 
Inusa Dawuda currently resides in Hamburg, Germany.

Discography – House / Dance / Reggae / Afro /

Discography – lounge / chillout 

See: http://www.discogs.com/artist/Inusa+Dawuda for complete discography.

References

External links 
 Inusa Dawuda Official Website
 Kingdom of Music Official Website 

1970 births
Living people
Ghanaian emigrants to Germany
Musicians from Hamburg
German house musicians
German saxophonists
21st-century saxophonists